Indonesian National Route 3 is the major road in Java Island, Indonesia. It passes through five provinces, namely  Banten, West Java, Central Java, Yogyakarta, and East Java. In parts it runs close to the south coast of Java. It connects Cilegon and Ketapang.

Route
Cilegon – Anyer – Carita – Labuan – Simpang Labuan - Cibaliung – Muara Binuangeun – Bayah – Cibareno – Cisolok – Pelabuhan Ratu – Bagbagan – Cikembang – Cibadak - Cisaat - Sukabumi – Gekbrong - Cianjur – Citarum - Rajamandala - Padalarang – Bandung – Cileunyi – Nagreg – Limbangan - Malangbong – Rajapolah – Ancol – Ciawi – Ciamis – Majenang – Karangpucung - Wangon – Rawalo - Sampang - Buntu – Kebumen – Prembun - Kutoarjo - Purworejo – Karangnongko - Temon - Wates – Milir - Sentolo - Yogyakarta – Piyungan - Gading - Wonosari – Semanu – Ponjong – Pracimantoro – Donorojo – Punung – Pringkuku – Pacitan – Panggul – Dongko - Trenggalek – Tulungagung – Blitar – Wlingi – Kepanjen – Gondanglegi – Dampit - Lumajang – Wonorejo – Tanggul - Rambipuji – Jember – Mayang - Garahan  - Genteng - Gambor - Rogojampi - Banyuwangi – Ketapang

Gallery

References

3
Transport in Banten
Transport in West Java
Transport in Central Java
Transport in the Special Region of Yogyakarta
Transport in East Java